Ireland competed at the 1992 Summer Olympics in Barcelona, Spain. 58 competitors, 49 men and 9 women, took part in 47 events in 12 sports.

Medalists

Competitors
The following is the list of number of competitors in the Games.

Archery

Veteran Noel Lynch was the only Irish archer at the nation's fifth appearance in the tournament.  He did not qualify for the elimination rounds.

Men's Individual Competition:
 Noel Lynch — Ranking round, 62nd place (0-0)

Athletics

Men's 5.000 metres
John Doherty
 Heat — 13:41.27 (→ did not advance)

Frank O'Mara
 Heat — 13:38.79 (→ did not advance)

Paul Donovan
 Heat — 14:03.79 (→ did not advance)

Men's 10.000 metres
Sean Dollman
 Heat — 28:55.77 (→ did not advance)

Noel Berkeley
 Heat — 29:23.58 (→ did not advance)

Men's Marathon
 John Treacy 2:24.11 (→ 51st place)
 Thomas Hughes 2:32.55 (→ 72nd place)
 Andrew Ronan — did not finish (→ no ranking)

Men's 20 km Walk
Jimmy McDonald — 1:25:16 (→ 6th place)
Bobby O'Leary — DSQ (→ no ranking)

Men's Javelin Throw
Terry McHugh 
 Qualification — 73.26 m (→ did not advance)

Men's Discus Throw
Nick Sweeney 
 Qualification — 57.68 m (→ did not advance)

Men's Shot Put
 Victor Costello 
 Qualification — 17.15 m (→ did not advance)

Paul Quirke 
 Qualification — 17.01 m (→ did not advance)

Women's 10 km Walk
Perri Williams — 54:53 (→ 37th place)

Boxing

Canoeing

Cycling

Five cyclists, all men, represented Ireland in 1992.

Men's road race
 Kevin Kimmage
 Conor Henry
 Paul Slane

Men's team time trial
 Mark Kane
 Kevin Kimmage
 Robert Power
 Paul Slane

Equestrianism

Fencing

One male fencer represented Ireland in 1992.

Men's épée
 Michael O'Brien

Judo

Rowing

Men's Single Sculls
Niall O'Toole 3rd in the D Final (→ 21st place)

Sailing

Swimming

Men's 100m Breaststroke
Gary O'Toole
 Heat – 1:05.48 (→ did not advance, 38th place)

Men's 200m Breaststroke
Gary O'Toole
 Heat – 2:17.66 (→ did not advance, 20th place)

Men's 200m Individual Medley
Gary O'Toole
 Heat – 2:07.67 (→ did not advance, 34th place)

Women's 200m Backstroke
Michelle Smith
 Heat – 2:21.37 (→ did not advance, 35th place)

Women's 200m Individual Medley
Michelle Smith
 Heat – 2:23.83 (→ did not advance, 32nd place)

Women's 400m Individual Medley
Michelle Smith
 Heat – 4:58.94 (→ did not advance, 26th place)

Tennis

Men's Singles Competition
 Owen Casey
 First round — Lost to Magnus Gustafsson (Sweden) 6-7, 1-6, 4-6

Men's Doubles Competition
 Owen Casey and Eoin Collins
 First round — Defeated Leonardo Lavalle and Francisco Maciel (Mexico) 7-6, 6-4, retired
 Second round — Lost to Jakob Hlasek and Marc Rosset (Switzerland) 6-7, 3-6, 4-6

References

Nations at the 1992 Summer Olympics
1992
1992 in Irish sport